The Maritz rebellion, also known as the Boer revolt or Five Shilling rebellion, was an armed insurrection in South Africa in 1914, at the start of World War I. It was led by Boers who supported the re-establishment of the South African Republic in the Transvaal. Many members of the South African government were themselves former Boers who had fought with the Maritz rebels against the British in the Second Boer War, which had ended twelve years earlier. The rebellion failed, and its ringleaders received heavy fines and terms of imprisonment.

Prelude 

At the end of the Second Boer War twelve years earlier, all former Boer combatants had been asked to sign a pledge that they would abide by the peace terms. Some, like Deneys Reitz, refused and were exiled from South Africa. Over the following decade many returned home, and not all of them signed the pledge upon returning. At the end of the second Boer War, those Boers who had fought to the end were known as "" ("bitter enders"); by the time of the rebellion, those who had not taken the pledge and wanted to start a new war had also become known as the "bitter enders."

A German journalist who interviewed the former Boer general J. B. M. Hertzog for the  wrote: 

Paraphrasing the Irish Nationalists' "England's misfortune is the bitter enders' opportunity," the "bitter enders" and their supporters saw the start of World War I as that opportunity, particularly since England's enemy, Germany, had been their old supporter.

First World War starts 

The outbreak of hostilities in Europe in August 1914 had long been anticipated, and the government of the Union of South Africa was well aware of the significance of the common border South Africa shared with the German colony of South-West Africa. Prime Minister Louis Botha informed London that South Africa could defend itself and that the imperial garrison could depart for France; when the British government asked Botha whether his forces would invade German South-West Africa, the reply was that they could and would.

South African troops were mobilised along the border between the two countries under the command of General Henry Lukin and Lieutenant Colonel Manie Maritz early in September 1914.

Rebellion 

The Commandant-General of the Union Defence Force, Brigadier-General Christiaan Frederick Beyers was opposed to the South African government's decision to undertake offensive operations. He resigned his commission on 15 September 1914, writing "It is sad that the war is being waged against the 'barbarism' of the Germans. We have forgiven but not forgotten all the barbarities committed in our own country during the South African War", referring to the atrocities committed during the Boer War. A nominated senator, General Koos de la Rey, who had refused to support the government in parliament over this issue, associated himself with Beyers. On 15 September they set off together to visit Major JCG (Jan) Kemp in Potchefstroom, who had a large armoury and a force of 2,000 men who had just finished training, many of whom were thought to be sympathetic to the rebels' ideas.

Although it is not known what the purpose of their visit was, the South African government believed it to be an attempt to instigate a rebellion, as stated in the Government Blue Book on the rebellion. According to General Beyers it was to discuss plans for the simultaneous resignation of leading army officers as protest against the government's actions, similar to what had happened in Britain two years earlier in the Curragh incident over the Irish Home Rule Bill. On the way to the meeting de la Rey's car was fired upon by a policeman at a road block set up to look for the Foster gang. De la Rey was hit and killed.  At his funeral, however, many Nationalist Afrikaners believed and perpetuated the rumour that it was a government assassination, which added fuel to the fire. Their anger was even further inflamed by Siener van Rensburg and his controversial prophecies.

Lt-Col Maritz, who was head of a commando of Union forces on the border of German South-West Africa, allied himself with the Germans. He then issued a proclamation on behalf of a provisional government. It stated that "the former South African Republic and Orange Free State as well as the Cape Province and Natal are proclaimed free from British control and independent, and every White inhabitant of the mentioned areas, of whatever nationality, are hereby called upon to take their weapons in their hands and realize the long-cherished ideal of a Free and Independent South Africa." It was announced that Generals Beyers, de Wet, Maritz, Kemp and Bezuidenhout were to be the first leaders of this provisional government. Maritz's forces occupied Keimoes in the Upington area. The Lydenburg commando under General De Wet took possession of the town of Heilbron, held up a train and captured government stores and ammunition. Some of the prominent citizens of the area joined him, and by the end of the week he had a force of 3,000 men. Beyers also gathered a force in the Magaliesberg; in all, about 12,000 rebels rallied to the cause. The irony was that General Louis Botha had around 32,000 troops to counter the rebels and of the 32,000 troops about 20,000 of them were Afrikaners.

The government declared martial law on 12 October 1914, and forces loyal to the government under the command of General Louis Botha and Jan Smuts proceeded to destroy the rebellion. General Maritz was defeated on 24 October and took refuge with the Germans. The Beyers commando was attacked and dispersed at Commissioners Drift on 28 October, after which Beyers joined forces with Kemp, but drowned in the Vaal River on 8 December. General de Wet was captured in Bechuanaland on 1 December 1914, with 52 others on a farm called Waterbury. His remark when captured was: "Thank God it was not an Englishman who captured me after all". His grandson, Dr Carel de Wet, then Minister of Health, consecrated a monument at this spot on 14 February 1970. General Kemp, having taken his commando across the Kalahari desert, losing 300 out of 800 men and most of their horses on the 1,100 kilometre month-long trek, joined Maritz in German South-West Africa, but returned after about a week and surrendered on 4 February 1915.

Aftermath 

After the Maritz rebellion was suppressed, the South African army continued their operations into German South West Africa and conquered it by July 1915.

Compared to the fate of the ringleaders of the Easter Rising in Ireland in 1916, the leading Boer rebels got off relatively lightly with terms of imprisonment of six and seven years and heavy fines.  Two years later they were released from prison, as Louis Botha recognised the value of reconciliation.

One notable exception was Jopie Fourie, a Union Defence Force officer who had failed to resign his commission before joining the rebellion. He was executed.

See also
 African theatre of World War I
 Jan Smuts and the Old Boers
 Leliefontein massacre (also involved Manie Maritz)

References

Sources 

 on the ANC website and says ""
 
 
 , Military History Journal – Vol 2 No 2

Further reading

 T. R. H. Davenport, "The South African Rebellion, 1914." English Historical Review 78.306 (1963): 73–94 online.
 Sandra Swart.  "'Desperate Men': The 1914 Rebellion and the Polities of Poverty." South African Historical Journal 42.1 (2000): 161–175.
 Sandra Swart. 1998. "A Boer and His Gun and His Wife Are Three Things Always Together": Republican Masculinity and the 1914 Rebellion. Journal of Southern African Studies 24 (4, Special Issue on Masculinities in Southern Africa): 737–751.
 P.J. Sampson. The Capture of De Wet, The South African Rebellion 1914. Edward Arnold 1915.
 "Rebelspoor " by L.J Bothma (2014) 
 "Wie is die skuldiges?"  Harm Oost (1956)
 "Agter Die Skerms met Die Rebelle" by C. F. McDonald, (1949)
 Report on the Outbreak of the Rebellion and the Policy of the Government With Regard to its Suppression, HMSO, 1915, Cd.7874

External links 
 Wessels, André: Afrikaner (Boer) Rebellion (Union of South Africa), in: 1914-1918-online. International Encyclopedia of the First World War.

African resistance to colonialism
Rebellions in Africa
Jan Smuts
Conflicts in 1914
1914 in South Africa
Military history of South Africa during World War I
20th-century rebellions
Political history of South Africa
Rebellions against the British Empire